Gigi Fernández and Natasha Zvereva were the defending champions but lost in the final 7–5, 2–6, 6–3 against Jana Novotná and Arantxa Sánchez Vicario.

Seeds
Champion seeds are indicated in bold text while text in italics indicates the round in which those seeds were eliminated. All seventeen seeded teams received byes into the second round.

Draw

Finals

Top half

Section 1

Section 2

Bottom half

Section 3

Section 4

External links
 1995 Lipton Championships Women's Doubles Draw

Women's Doubles
Lipton Championships - Women's Doubles